The European Championship is a continental competition of American football contested by the member countries of IFAF Europe.

Results

Medal table

Participating nations
Legend
 – Champions
 – Runners-up
 – Third place
4–6 – 4th to 6th places.
 –  Qualified, but withdrew
 – Did not qualify
 – Did not enter or withdrew
 – Country did not exist or national team was inactive
 – host nation

References

External links 
 International Federation of American Football IFAF

IFAF competitions
Recurring sporting events established in 2015